The 1974 NBA Expansion Draft was the sixth expansion draft of the National Basketball Association (NBA). The draft was held on May 20, 1974, so that the newly founded New Orleans Jazz could acquire players for the upcoming 1974–75 season. New Orleans had been awarded the expansion team on March 7, 1974. The Jazz moved to Salt Lake City in 1979 and are currently known as the Utah Jazz. In an NBA expansion draft, new NBA teams are allowed to acquire players from the previously established teams in the league. Not all players on a given team are available during an expansion draft, since each team can protect a certain number of players from being selected. In this draft, each of the seventeen other NBA teams had protected seven players from their roster and the Jazz selected seventeen unprotected players, one from each team.

The Jazz were formed and owned by a group headed by Fred Rosenfeld and Sam Battistone. Former college basketball coach Scotty Robertson was hired as the franchise's first head coach and 11-time All-Star Elgin Baylor was named as one of the assistant coach. The Jazz's selections included five-time All-Star Walt Bellamy, three-time All-Star Bob Kauffman and one-time All-Star John Block. However, none of them had long careers with the Jazz; Bellamy, who was 35 years old, was waived after one game and both Kauffman and Block were traded. Prior to the draft, the Jazz made a trade with the Atlanta Hawks which brought two-time All-Star Pete Maravich to the Jazz. In exchange for Maravich, the Jazz sent the first guard and forward chosen in the expansion draft, which turned out to be Bob Kauffman and Dean Meminger, along with future draft picks to the Hawks. Ten players from the expansion draft joined the Jazz for their inaugural season, but only three played more than one season for the team.

Key

Selections

Notes
 Number of years played in the NBA prior to the draft
 Never played a game for the franchise

References
General

Specific

External links
NBA.com
NBA.com: NBA Draft History

Expansion
Utah Jazz lists
National Basketball Association expansion draft
National Basketball Association lists
NBA expansion draft